Clio was the name of at least three ships of the Italian Navy and may refer to:

 Italian cruiser Clio, a  renamed  in 1894 before she was launched and discarded in 1913.
 , a  launched in 1906 and discarded in 1927.
 , a  launched in 1938 and stricken in 1959.

Italian Navy ship names